Lüen-Castiel railway station is a railway station on the Chur–Arosa railway (the "Arosabahn") of the Rhaetian Railway (RhB). It is situated in Lüen and also serves nearby Castiel.

A short distance to the west of the station, in the direction of Chur, is the Castielertobel Viaduct, which, after the Langwieser Viaduct and the Gründjitobel Viaduct, is the third-largest bridge on the Arosa line.

Services
The following services stop at Lüen-Castiel:

References

External links
 
 

Railway stations in Graubünden
Rhaetian Railway stations
Railway stations in Switzerland opened in 1914